Arthur Foot (1901–1968) was an English schoolmaster, educationalist and academic. 

Arthur Foot or Foote may also refer to:

Arthur Wynne Foot (1838–1900), Irish doctor, professor of medicine, and an entomologist
Arthur Foote (1853–1937), American classical composer
Arthur De Wint Foote (1849–1933), American civil engineer and entrepreneur
Arthur E. Foote (1874–1946), American tennis player